João Teixeira de Faria (born 24 June 1942), known also as João de Deus (John of God), is a Brazilian is a self-proclaimed medium and psychic surgeon. He was based in Abadiânia, where he ran a "spiritual healing center" called the Casa de Dom Inácio de Loyola. He received media coverage on CNN, ABC News, and The Oprah Winfrey Show. James Randi and Joe Nickell exposed his healing procedures as nothing more than carnival tricks, and there is no evidence that the benefits that have been reported by patients are anything more than placebo effects.

In 2018, after over 600 accusations of sexual abuse, Faria turned himself in to police. In December 2019, he was sentenced to 19 years and four months for the rapes of four women. On 20 January 2020, 40 years were added to his prison time for the rape of five additional women. The sentences add up to 63 years and 4 months.

Early life
João Teixeira de Faria was born in Cachoeira de Goiás on 24 June 1942. He has no medical training and describes himself as a "simple farmer". He completed two years of education and spent a number of years travelling from village to village in the states of Goiás and Minas Gerais as a garrafeiro, a sort of travelling medicine man.

Career

Overview
Faria says he was told by his spirit guides that he must expand his work to reach more people and spiritist medium Chico Xavier told him he should go to the small Goiás town of Abadiânia to fulfill his healing mission. Around 1978, when João first performed healings there, he just sat outdoors in a chair near the main road where people began to arrive seeking cures for their illnesses and conditions. Gradually the numbers increased to thousands per day and he developed his centre, Casa de Dom Inácio de Loyola. The Casa de Dom Inácio de Loyola has since been visited by millions of people seeking healing. He also owns a nearby cattle ranch, which covers about 1,000 acres and is valued at over 2 million reais.

Much of his income comes from selling passionflower preparations, the single herb prescribed by Faria to cure a variety of ailments. The company which bears João Teixeira Faria's initials, JTF Ltda., markets the drug and is registered in the name of his wife, Ana Keyla Teixeira, and his driver and employee Abadio da Cruz.

Claims of healing powers

Faria regularly prescribes meditation and walks to a nearby waterfall as part of treatment. The Casa also sells herbs, blessed items and artefacts such as magic triangles. It was estimated by 60 Minutes Australia in 2014 that these sales earn Faria over $10 million per year.

When called for a spiritual surgery by Faria, patients are offered the choice of "visible" or "invisible" operations. If they select an "invisible" operation (or are younger than 18 or older than 52) they are directed to sit in a room and meditate. Faria says that spiritual physicians can perform surgery on the actual patient via a surrogate when the actual patient is unable to make the trip.

A very small percentage of people choose a "visible" operation where Faria operates without traditional anesthetic. Instead he says he uses "energized" mineral water and the spiritual energies present, the latter of which are provided by groups of volunteers who meditate in a separate room called the "current room". These practices, such as inserting scissors or forceps deep into a nose and scraping an eye without an anesthetic or antiseptics, have been scrutinised by medical authorities and skeptical investigators such as James Randi, who has called for Faria to stop victimizing people with stunts and trickery.

Faria tells people not to stop taking their medicine and says not everyone he serves will be cured. Often the treatment includes capsules containing pure passion flower that he says carry special blessed spiritual energy to support the individual's healing process. Faria has undergone trials and scrutiny of his work. He has been arrested several times for practicing medicine without a licence and has been jailed once.

Outside Brazil
Faria has travelled to other countries to perform healing ceremonies called Live Events. Gail Thackray, Casa Medium, said in her book Spiritual Journeys: Visiting John of God that the main entities that incorporate in Brazil are the same ones at Live Events, along with thousands of other entities doing healing work.

Because of the medical laws around the world, blessed water is prescribed instead of herbs. It is available for about $3 a bottle and everyone who receives a spiritual intervention must drink this blessed water.

Media coverage

ABC news report
On 14 July 2005, the American Broadcasting Company (ABC) ran a news report about Faria on Primetime Live. The programme featured five people with various medical conditions, including chronic fatigue syndrome, Lou Gehrig's disease and an inoperable brain tumour. Each patient saw Faria and ABC claimed that in three of the cases there had been an improvement. A young female athlete who had been paraplegic was shown beginning to move her legs.

ABC's update on the five subjects, while not mentioning subject Mary Hendrickson, indicated that one subject is making either slow progress or none at all, two are worse, and one shows improvement. Subject David Ames died from complications on 16 July 2008. Despite undergoing Faria's psychic surgery and being declared cured, Lisa Melman's breast cancer got progressively worse. She stated the tumor had grown and became painful. She continued to suffer and died in 2012.

Skeptic James Randi spent about an hour in New York being interviewed and taped for the report. Randi later criticised ABC for having cherry-picked his comments to show more credibility for Faria than was justified. Randi gave scientific explanations for all the activities observed. Randi revealed the natural explanations for activities ranging from putting forceps in the nose, random cutting of the flesh, 'scraping' of the eyeball, the subsequent absence of infection, and other activities one by one as age old parlor tricks. However, he was dismayed that none of his critical comments were shown in the final segment. This was cut down to under 20 seconds of screen time.

The Oprah Winfrey Show
On 17 November 2010, Susan Casey wrote in O Magazine about her trip to see Faria in Brazil and was subsequently covered on The Oprah Winfrey Show. The article was entitled "Leap of Faith: Meet John of God". The show was entitled "Do You Believe in Miracles?". In both, she discusses her need to deal with the traumatic loss of her father. After he suddenly died in 2008, Casey experienced a "tsunami of grief" that she says she couldn't escape from. She wondered if Faria could help heal her grief. She met him twice and later stated, "Three hours went by like 20 minutes, and it was blissfulit was like I was floating." Casey claims she was able to speak with her dead father. "It was very real," she says. "More of a vision than I had ever had before. ... I got this feeling like I shouldn't be sad, that everything was okay."

While Casey stated that the whole experience sounds unusual, she said that she is "not a woo-woo person" and that Faria helped her find healing. Casey stated that she was a neutral observer. Jeff Rediger, a psychiatrist from Harvard Medical School in Boston, was provided as a "skeptic". Rediger was astonished to discover bleeding from his torso after "invisible" surgery. The show did not provide scientific or medical explanations for the procedures performed. In depth critical investigative reports followed the broadcast.

On 17 March 2013, Oprah's Next Chapter, Season 2, Episode 116, aired a televised show titled "John of God". Oprah traveled to Brazil to meet and talk with Faria. She also interviewed Magnus Kemppii, from Sweden, about his "surgery", and five Americans who hope to be cured from their ailments.

In December 2018, Faria was accused of sexual abuse, rape and pedophilia by more than 200 women. After the allegations became public, Oprah deleted the interviews from her site and released a note stating that she hopes justice will be served.

CNN coverage
On the 22 December 2010, episode of CNN's AC360, Sanjay Gupta interviewed two of the commentators Oprah Winfrey had sent to meet Faria. Critical investigative reports followed the broadcast.

60 Minutes Australia
Faria's first visit to Australia and a 'Live Event' scheduled 22–24 November 2014 at the Sydney Showground in Sydney Olympic Park garnered much media attention.

After visiting Faria at his "Casa" in Abadiânia, Brazil, the Australian 60 Minutes television program aired a critical investigative report on 25 October 2014, examining Faria's healing treatment practices, the amount of money being made and raising questions about sexual assault allegations against him. The two-part program hosted by reporter Michael Usher was a follow-up to Liz Hayes' 1998 investigation of Faria.

In Part 1 of the follow-up, reporter Michael Usher revealed that a woman declared as cured of breast cancer by a spirit entity channeled by Faria died in 2003. A woman in a wheelchair with multiple sclerosis, who in the 1998 report said she visited Faria with the expectation of walking again, didn't feel any effect, is still in a wheelchair, and suffered a deterioration in her condition. Her trip to the Casa cost $5,000. Usher reported that none of the other people (forty Australians) who made the pilgrimage that Hayes joined for investigation improved.

Usher's report said that some of the thousands in Faria's audience hope to receive "spiritual surgery" from him. In an extended interview, emergency medicine specialist Dr. David Rosengren personally examined and reported these practices as horrendous and barbaric, saying: "… the modern medical world could not condone this behavior in any way whatsoever". The possibility of Faria coming to Australia had also concerned the Australian Medical Association.

In Part 2 of his report, Usher stated that there were two deaths in recent years at the Casa that warranted investigations, but no one was charged. He also reported that in 2010, when Faria visited Sedona, Arizona, the police department investigated him because a woman said he took her hands and placed them on his genitals. The case never went to court; one of his associates encouraged the woman to drop the allegations.

The Catholic Church, through its representative Rev. Brian Lucas, issued a televised verbal warning, stating "John of God doesn't have any official affiliation with the Catholic Church". He cautioned all to be very skeptical of people seeking publicity with claims of miracles and faith healing, more so when there is a lot of money involved.

Montreal Gazette
On 22 July 2016, the Montreal Gazette published a report on John of God, "Brazilian 'healer' John of God leads cancer patients by the nose", by columnist Joe Schwarcz, accompanied by a video report from 'Dr Joe's' The Right Chemistry series. Schwarcz is an author and a professor at McGill University in Montreal, Quebec. He is the director of McGill's Office for Science & Society, which aims to demystify science for the public. The report starts by detailing Faria's life history as a medium and psychic surgeon. It then examines his practice and supposed treatments, such as the 'Up Your Nose' surgery to treat cancers. Schwarcz also criticised Faria's choices of treatment for his own health problems.

Personal life
Faria was married several times and has had an unknown number of children from his different wives and affairs.

In 2015, Faria was diagnosed with aggressive stomach cancer. A doctor of conventional medicine, Raul Cutait, extracted a 6 cm gastric adenocarcinoma from his stomach. The surgery and follow-up of five months of chemotherapy took place at the Hospital Sírio-Libanês in São Paulo. Faria did not report these facts to the public, originally saying he was being hospitalised for a stomach hernia.

Arrest and imprisonment
In December 2018, allegations of abuse by Faria were put forward by 12 women. The number of claims led to the Prosecution Office of the State of Goiás creating an email address and phone line to receive all accusations towards him. In 30 hours, over 200 complaints were received from nine different Brazilian states and two claims from abroad. Claims were reported by the prosecution's office as having potential to be the biggest sexual scandal in the history of Brazil, overwhelming the Roger Abdelmassih case. Claims included the alleged abuse of victims as young as 14 years old, as well as a woman who revealed having been abused for three days. In 11 December, four days after the Conversa com Bial show, the number of sexual abuse complaints against Faria had reached 206, prompting him to limit his appointments at Casa Dom Inácio de Loyola. Questioned by reporters, he simply said "I'm innocent" and walked away. On 12 December, the public prosecutor of Goiás called for the arrest of Faria. On 16 December, Faria surrendered himself to the police. The number of sexual abuse accusations gradually reached 600. The rapes occurred from 1986 to 2017.

Faria's daughter Dalva supported the accusers, calling her father a "monster" and alleging that she was beaten and raped by him until she ran away when she was 14 years old. Faria was transferred to a hospital from prison in March 2019. On 19 December, he was sentenced to 19 years and four months for the rapes of four women. He is facing additional cases related to 10 sex crimes. He was released from prison on house arrest when the COVID-19 pandemic struck in early 2020, due to his age and poor health.

See also
 Pseudoscience
 Jeanette Wilson – self-proclaimed medium and spiritual healer

References

External links

Skeptical analysis
 
 
 Swift-Online Newsletter of the James Randi Educational Foundation
 For shame! Oprah Winfrey shills for faith healer John of God
 "John of God in Brazil", CARM (Christian Apologetics and Research Ministry) dated
 "John of God: Healings by Entities?" by Joe Nickell, CSI, Center for Skeptical Inquiry, October 2007
 "Newsweek: In Flagrante/ CFI, Center For Inquiry?" by Joe Nickell, CFI, Center For Inquiry, 11 March 2016
 "Skeptical Inquirer: The Not So Divine Acts of Medium "John of God"" by Felipe Nogueira, Skeptical Inquirer,   Volume 43, No. 4  July / August 2019

Media coverage
 
 "The Right Chemistry: Brazilian 'healer' John of God leads cancer patients by the nose/ Montreal Gazette?" by Joe Schwarcz,  Montreal Gazette 22 July 2016
 
 
 
 
 
 
 60 minutes "John of God" Report

Faith healers
Living people
1942 births
People from Goiás
Brazilian spiritual mediums
Psychic surgeons
Brazilian people convicted of rape
Articles containing video clips